St Peter at Gowts is a Grade I listed parish church in Lincoln, Lincolnshire, England.

History

The church dates from the 11th century. The north aisle and porch were built in 1852 to designs of William Adams Nicholson. The chancel was enlarged in 1887 by C. Hodgson Fowler. A hanging rood was installed in 1920 by Temple Lushington Moore.

In 1968 the Victorian St Andrew's Church, Lincoln was closed and demolished and in 1980 the parish was renamed St Peter at Gowts and St Andrew.

Bells
The bells date from 1872 by the London founders Mears and Stainbank.  There are currently restrictions on both practice and ringing.

Organ
The first organ recorded was already in place in 1872, and built by T. H. Nicholson.  That was replaced by a different organ, a Bevington, that was moved in 1900 to Tattershall.

In the 1920s a second-hand organ by Nicholson of Worcester was obtained from a private house. In 1949 it was replaced with another organ by Nicholson of Worcester.  This had previously been installed at All Souls' Church, Aylestone Road, Leicester. This later instrument retains some parts of the 1920s device.

See also: Churches in Lincoln
St Martin's Church, Lincoln
St Mary le Wigford
St Peter at Arches Church, Lincoln
St Benedict's Church, Lincoln

References

External links

11th-century church buildings in England
Church of England church buildings in Lincolnshire
Grade I listed churches in Lincolnshire
Saint Peter